Cost plus may refer to:

 Cost Plus World Market, U.S. retail chain
 Cost-plus contract
 Cost-plus pricing
 Cost Plus Drugs